Alathur is a town in Alathur taluk of Perambalur district, Tamil Nadu, India. This town is the headquarters of Alathur taluk. The Postal Index Number of the town is 606303.

References

Cities and towns in Perambalur district